Melyssa Lombardi is an American softball coach who is the current head coach at Oregon.

Early life and education
Lombardi graduated from University of Oklahoma in 1997 with a degree in Health and Sports Science.

Coaching career

Oregon
On July 9, 2018, Melyssa Lombardi was announced as the new head coach of the Oregon softball program, replacing Mike White who left to be the head coach of Texas.

Controversy
When Lombardi became the head coach of the Oregon softball program, several players transferred from the program including Miranda Elish, Lauren Burke, Mary Iakopo, Shannon Rhodes, Megan Kleist, Maggie Balint, Alyssa Pinto, Mia Camuso, and Alexis Mack. Another player, Maddie MacGrandle, who transferred into the program that year quit the team midseason. This exodus of talented players left only one starter from the previous season's lineup still on the team, Haley Cruse. Most players did not speak publicly about their reasons for leaving but those who did cited concerns about the team culture.

In her third season with the Ducks, the NCAA gave Texas the 15-seed and did not seed the Ducks, instead sending them to the Austin Regional. Oregon and Texas met in the finals, setting up the first showdown between Lombardi's team and Mike White's team, which included Burke, Iakopo and Rhodes. Oregon won the first game 3-2 in an extra inning walk-off. Cruse scored the winning run to beat her former coach. Texas won the second game, 1-0 as the Ducks couldn't get anything going offensively. Burke scored the only run of that game. Since Oregon had already dropped a game earlier in the regional this was their second loss, eliminating them from the tournament while Texas moved on to the Super Regionals.

Head coaching record

College

References

Living people
Sportspeople from Glendale, Arizona
Oklahoma Sooners softball players
Oklahoma Sooners softball coaches
Oregon Ducks softball coaches
American softball coaches
Year of birth missing (living people)
Central Arizona Vaqueros softball players